PTX Summer Tour 2018 was the seventh concert tour by American a cappella group Pentatonix to promote their sixth studio album, PTX Presents: Top Pop, Vol. I. The tour began on July 12, 2018 in West Valley City, and concluded on September 16, 2018 in Tinley Park.

Background and development
On February 27, 2018, the group announced their new album, PTX Presents: Top Pop, Vol. I, along with a 39-city tour.

Set list
This set list is from the concert on July 12, 2018 in West Valley City. It is not intended to represent all shows from the tour.

"Sing"
"Finesse" (Bruno Mars cover)
"Attention" (Charlie Puth cover)
"Can't Sleep Love"
"Havana" (Camila Cabello cover)
"Stay" / "The Middle" (Zedd cover medley)
"Julie-O" (Kevin Olusola cello Mark Summer cover)
"Perfect (Ed Sheeran cover)
"Daft Punk"
"Despacito x Shape of You" (Luis Fonsi & Ed Sheeran cover medley)
"Imagine" (John Lennon cover)
"Love You Long Time" (Jasmine Sullivan cover)
"Evolution of Rihanna"
"New Rules x Are You That Somebody?" (Dua Lipa & Aaliyah cover medley)
"Cracked" / "Natural Disaster"
"Hallelujah" (Leonard Cohen cover)
"Sorry Not Sorry" (Demi Lovato cover)
Encore
 "Aha!" (Imogen Heap cover)
"Bohemian Rhapsody" (Queen cover)

Tour dates

References

2018 concert tours
Pentatonix concert tours